Ambovombe-Androy is a district of Androy in Madagascar.

References 

Districts of Androy